Dad! Where Are We Going? was a South Korean reality show featuring five celebrity fathers and their children as they travel to rural places and go on camping missions. The show debuted on MBC on January 6, 2013, as part of the Sunday Night programming block. The original cast members were announcer Kim Sung-joo, actor Lee Jong-hyuk, former soccer player Song Chong-gug, actor Sung Dong-il, and Vibe singer Yoon Min-soo (and their respective offspring).

Lee Jong-hyuk and Song Chong-gug left after season 1; Kim Sung-joo, Sung Dong-il and Yoon Min-soo remained, but Kim and Sung brought on different children for season 2. They were joined by former soccer player Ahn Jung-hwan, rapper Kim Jin-pyo, and actor Ryu Jin (and their respective offspring). Kim Jin-pyo left after several episodes (he stated he could not "blend in" with the other cast members), and was replaced by actor Jung Woong-in.

The series started off with a rather low rating of 7%, but it was 1.5% higher than I Am a Singer 2, also on MBC. On its 10th episode, it showed a great improvement with 13%, which surpassed KBS' Happy Sunday.

Due to its popularity in China, Hunan Television purchased the rights for a Chinese adaptation of the show, titled Where Are We Going, Dad?, which premiered on October 11, 2013.

After a two-year run, the show ended on January 18, 2015 and was replaced by Animals.

Cast

Season 1

Season 2

International versions

Awards and nominations

References

External links
  

2013 South Korean television series debuts
MBC TV original programming
South Korean variety television shows
South Korean reality television series
South Korean travel television series
Korean-language television shows
Parenting television series